Lurs are Iranian people living in the mountains of western Iran. The four Luri branches are the Bakhtiari, Mamasani, Kohgiluyeh and Lur proper, who are principally linked by the Luri language.

Lorestan Province is named after the Lurs, but the ethnic group also live in the provinces of Fars, Chaharmahal and Bakhtiari, Kohgiluyeh and Boyer-Ahmad, Khuzestan, Hamadan, Isfahan, Tehran and southern Ilam Province.

Language 

Luri is a Western Iranian language continuum spoken by about four million people. The continuum constitutes the three dialects of Bakhtiari, Luristani and Southern Luri and linguist Anonby situates them between Kurdish and Persian.

Luri branches 
There are several established branches of the Luri people.
 Bakhtiari
 Southern Lori
 Boyerahmadi (Yasuji)
 Kohgiluyei
 Mamasani
 Luristani (Northern Lori)
 Khorramabadi
 Borujerdi
 Bala Gariva Lori
 Hinimini
 Shuhani

History
 

Lurs are a mixture of aboriginal Iranian tribes, originating from Central Asia and the pre-Iranic tribes of western Iran, such as the Kassites (whose homeland appears to have been in what is now Lorestan) and Gutians. In accordance with geographical and archaeological matching, some historians argue that the Elamites were the Proto-Lurs, whose language became Iranian only in the Middle Ages. Michael M. Gunter states that they are closely related to the Kurds but that they "apparently began to be distinguished from the Kurds 1,000 years ago." He adds that the Sharafnama of Sharaf Khan Bidlisi "mentioned two Lur dynasties among the five Kurdish dynasties that had in the past enjoyed royalty or the highest form of sovereignty or independence." Sharafkhan dedicates a chapter of his 1597 book to the Lurs and Luri rulers, and he considered them to be Kurds.

Genetics

Considering their NRY variation, the Lurs are distinguished from other Iranian groups by their relatively elevated frequency of Y-DNA Haplogroup R1b (specifically, of subclade R1b1a2a-L23). Together with its other clades, the R1 group comprises the single most common haplogroup among the Lurs. Haplogroup J2a (subclades J2a3a-M47, J2a3b-M67, J2a3h-M530, more specifically) is the second most commonly occurring patrilineage in the Lurs and is associated with the diffusion of agriculturalists from the Neolithic Near East c. 8000-4000 BCE. Another haplogroup reaching a frequency above 10% is that of G2a, with subclade G2a3b accounting for most of this. Also significant is haplogroup E1b1b1a1b, for which the Lurs display the highest frequency in Iran. Lineages Q1b1 and Q1a3 present at 6%, and T at 4%.

Culture

The authority of tribal elders remains a strong influence among the nomadic population. It is not as dominant among the settled urban population. As among Kurds, Lur women have much greater freedom than women in other groups within the region. The women have more freedom to participate in different social activities, to wear diverse types of female clothing and to sing and dance in different ceremonies. Bibi Maryam Bakhtiari is a notable Luri woman. Luri music, Luri clothing and Luri folk dances are some of the most distinctive ethno-cultural characteristics of this ethnic group.

Many Lurs are small-scale agriculturists and shepherds. A few Lurs are also traveling musicians. Lurish textiles and weaving skills are highly esteemed for their workmanship and beauty.

Religion 
Most Lurs are Shia Muslim. Historically, many Lurs adhered to Yarsanism but almost the whole Yarsani Luri population has converted to Shia Islam. A small Sunni Muslim community of Lurs also exists. According to the Encyclopaedia of Islam, the Lurs revere bread and fire like the Zoroastrians. Recent reports also indicate a growing Zoroastrian religious movement, particularly among Bakhtiari Lurs.

See also
 Ahmed Lur
 Bakhtiari people

References

External links
 
 
 

Ethnic groups in Iran
Indigenous peoples of Western Asia
Iranian ethnic groups
Lorestan Province
Chaharmahal and Bakhtiari Province
Kohgiluyeh and Boyer-Ahmad Province
 
Khuzestan Province
Ilam Province
Fars Province
Hamadan Province
Tehran Province
Isfahan Province
Ethnic groups in the Middle East